The 1993 Georgia Bulldogs football team represented the University of Georgia during the 1993 NCAA Division I-A football season. Georgia completed the season with a 5–6 record.

Schedule

Roster

Season summary

Georgia Tech

A fight broke out late in the fourth quarter following a touchdown pass by Georgia.

References

Georgia
Georgia Bulldogs football seasons
Georgia Bulldogs football